Cymindis equestris is a species of ground beetle in the subfamily Harpalinae. It was described by Gebler in 1825.

References

equestris
Beetles described in 1825